= Owen McKinney =

Owen R. McKinney (1863 - 1942) was a dairy farmer in rural Pierce County, Washington who served for 14 years in the Washington House of Representatives from 1909 to 1923 in Washington. He was a Republican.

In 1923, he pushed for an anti-mask bill targeting Ku Klux Klan members who held rallies and were organizing at the time. He was president of the Pierce County Milk Producers' Association. He served on the Committee on Public Morals and the Committee on Dairy and Livestock.
